George Critchett may refer to:

Sir Anderson Critchett, 1st Baronet, real name George, (1845–1925) of the Critchett baronets
Sir (George) Montague Critchett, 2nd Baronet (1884–1941) of the Critchett baronets
George Critchett (surgeon)

See also
Critchett (surname)